Marco "Njaks" Rasmijn is an Aruban professional football manager.

Career
In 2000, he coached the Aruba national football team.

References

External links
Profile at Soccerway.com
Profile at Soccerpunter.com

Year of birth missing (living people)
Living people
Aruban football managers
Aruba national football team managers
Place of birth missing (living people)